Histamine intolerance, sometimes called histaminosis, is an over-accumulation of dietary histamine in the human body. Histamine intolerance is sometimes informally called an allergy; however, the intolerance is technically caused by the gradual accumulation of extracellular histamine due to an imbalance.

Roughly 1% of the population has histamine intolerance; of those, 80% are middle-aged.

General 

The imbalance in histamine intolerance is between the synthesis and selective release of histamine from certain granulocytes (i.e., mast cells and basophils), versus the breakdown of histamine by the enzymes which metabolize it, such as diamine oxidase (DAO) and histamine N-methyltransferase (HNMT).

In contrast, allergic reactions involving an immediate allergic response to an allergen are caused by anaphylactic degranulation, which is the abrupt and explosive release of "pre-formed mediators", including histamine, from mast cells and basophils throughout the body.

Symptoms 
Possible symptoms after ingestion of histamine-rich food include:

 Skin rash, hives, eczema, itching
 Headache, flushing, migraine, dizziness
 Narrowed or runny nose, difficulty breathing, bronchial asthma, sore throat
 Bloating, diarrhea, constipation, nausea / vomiting, abdominal pain, stomach sticking, heartburn
 High blood pressure (hypertension), tachycardia, cardiac arrhythmias, low blood pressure (hypotension)
 Menstrual disorders (dysmenorrhea), cystitis, urethritis and mucosal irritation of female genitalia
 Water retention (edema), bone marrow edema (BME), joint pain
 Fatigue, seasickness, tiredness, sleep disorders
 Confusion, nervousness, depressive moods

Metabolism 
In the human body, histamine is metabolized extracellularly by the enzyme diamine oxidase (DAO), and intracellularly by histamine N-methyltransferase (HNMT) and aldehyde oxidases (AOX1).  In histamine intolerance, the activity of DAO is limited, and histamine taken up by the diet and formed in the body is only partially metabolized. The consumption of histamine-containing food (e.g., red wine or hard cheese) leads to a pseudoallergic reaction. It is unclear how histamine passes through the intestinal wall during absorption and enters the blood without coming into contact with the aldehyde oxidases expressed in intestinal cells and histamine N-methyltransferases.

Potentially harmful foods
The following food categories have been quoted in literature as histamine rich:

Meat and fish
 Fish products, especially canned fish
 Ham
 Offal
 Pork
 Salami
 Smoked meat
 Other seafood

Dairy
 Matured ("hard") cheeses - the higher degree of ripeness, the higher histamine content

Alcohol
 Beer (especially top-fermented and cloudy/colored)
 Some French Champagne (made partially with red grapes)
 Red Wine

Tobacco
Active or passive exposure to tobacco smoke is suspected of favouring histamine intolerance, but has not been adequately studied.

Fruits, vegetables, legumes and roots
 Avocado
 Bamboo sprouts
 Beans
 Citrus fruits
 Eggplant 
 Horseradish
 Mushrooms
 Papayas
 Plums
 Raisins
 Sauerkraut
 Spinach
 Strawberries
 Tomatoes
 Other molds (e.g. noble-mold from cheeses and salamis)

Other
 Chocolate (chocolate itself does not contain histamine, but it does contain cocoa, which blocks the function of the histamine-clearing enzyme DAO)
 Nuts
 Products with vinegar, such as pickles or mustard
 Soy and soy products (e.g., tofu)

(This list is drawn from the German Wikipedia article on histamine intolerance. It has been further expanded using Verträglichkeit von histaminhaltigen Lebensmitteln (PDF; 28 kB)).

Drug interactions 
 Some medicines or so-called histamine-liberators (e.g., certain food additives) may delay the breakdown of histamine, or release histamine in the body. 
 Alcohol consumption increases the permeability of the cell membrane and thus lowers the histamine tolerance limit, which is why particularly strong reactions can occur when mixing alcohol and histamine-rich foods (e.g., red wine and cheese).
 Incompatibility of anti-inflammatory and analgesic medications in persons with histamine intolerance:
 Anti-inflammatory / analgesic drugs that increase allergen-specific histamine release in allergy sufferers are reaction inducing:[8]

 Anti-inflammatory/analgesic drugs that inhibit the allergen-specific histamine release in people with allergies are not reaction including:[8]

 Contrast agents – X-ray contrast allergy:
 R. Jarisch: Contrast reaction is misleadingly referred to as allergy and, because contrast media contain iodine, is almost always mistaken for iodine allergy. "Contrast agents release histamine. The reason why, in most cases, nothing happens when administering contrast media is that most patients have no histamine intolerance. But if a patient reacts, anaphylactic shock is inevitable. "For safety reasons, an antihistamine should always be given to people with histamine intolerance prior to examination with an X-ray contrast medium. In addition, adherence to a histamine-free diet 24 hours before x-ray studies with contrast agents is recommended for minimizing histamine exposure. p. 127/128 in [8]

Diagnosis 
For a diagnosis, the case history is essential. However, since many complaints such as headaches, migraines, bronchial asthma, hypotension, arrhythmia and dysmenorrhea (painful periods) may be caused by something other than histamine intolerance, it is not surprising that half of suspected diagnoses are not confirmed.

The diagnosis is usually made by intentionally provoking a reaction. However, since histamine can potentially cause life-threatening conditions, the following procedure is preferred: take blood samples before and after a 14-day diet, and measure changes in histamine and diamine oxidase (DAO) levels. Rather than increase histamine during the test diet, eliminate it. This procedure does not endanger the patient. Quite the contrary: in the presence of histamine intolerance, the symptoms have improved or disappeared completely. At the same time, the histamine blood level halves and the DAO increases significantly. If there is no histamine intolerance, the blood levels do not change and neither do the symptoms. Simultaneously, food allergy, cross-reactions with pollen, fructose malabsorption, lactose intolerance, and celiac disease should be excluded.

Therapy 
The basis of treatment is a reduction of the dietary histamine through a histamine-poor diet. Certain foods (e.g., citrus fruits) and certain medicines (e.g., morphine) which do not contain histamine per se are also to be avoided, because they are known to release histamine stored in the body (histamine liberation).

If eating histamine-containing foods is unavoidable, antihistamines and cromolyn sodium may be effective. The intake of diaminoxidase (DAO) in capsule form with meals may reduce the symptoms of histamine intolerance.

In cases of high blood glutamate, such as can occur in some cases of eczema and histamine intolerance, Reinhart Jarisch recommends vitamin B6 treatment. This promotes the body's own synthesis of DAO and thus fights the effects of histamine intolerance. The reference ranges (normal values) for blood glutamic acid are 20–107 in infants, 18–65 in children and 28-92 μmol / ml in adults.

See also 

 Mast cell
 Basophil
 Food intolerance
 Red wine headache

References

Literature 
 Abbot, Lieners, Mayer, Missbichler, Pfisterer, Schmutz: Nahrungsmittelunverträglichkeit (Histaminintoleranz). HSC, Mauerbach 2006, .
 Reinhart Jarisch: Histamin-Intoleranz, Histamin und Seekrankheit. Thieme 2004, .
 Nadja Schäfers: Histaminarm kochen – vegetarisch. pala-Verlag, Darmstadt 2009, .
 Anja Völkel: Gesunde Küche: bewusst genießen – schmackhaft & lecker. AVA-Verlag, 2013, .
 I. Reese: Streitthema Histaminintoleranz. (CME zertifizierte Fortbildung) In: Der Hautarzt. 65, 2014, S. 559–566, doi:10.1007/s00105-014-2815-2.

External links 

Allergology
Intolerance
Histamine
Sensitivities